Brockwell may refer to:

Places 
 Brockwell, Arkansas, an unincorporated community in Newburg Township, Izard County, Arkansas, United States
 Brockwell, Somerset, a hamlet in Wootton Courtenay parish, England

People 
 Bill Brockwell (1865–1935), English cricketer
 George Brockwell (1809–1876), English cricketer
 Gladys Brockwell (1894–1929), American actress
 Sam Brockwell (1871–1945), Australian rules footballer
 Sherwood Battle Brockwell (1885–1953), American fire marshal
 Simon Brockwell, Australian rugby league footballer
 Stephen Brockwell, Canadian poet